The Seaside Inn (formerly the Seaside Inn & Cottages) is an Inn in Kennebunkport, Maine which has been in continuous operation under the same family since 1667, making it one of the oldest companies in the United States.

History
Seaside Inn was established some time before 1667 by John Gooch who was commissioned by Ferdinando Gorges, an agent of King Charles II, to "reside on the ocean-front peninsula at the mouth of the Kennebunk River and ferry travellers across the River." John Gooch was the first settler in the Cape Neddick area, arriving in 1637.

The inn has been in continuous operation by the Gooch family since its inception and as of 2018 is owned by the twelfth-generation descendants.

Literature
The early Gooch family history was chronicled in the 1929 novel Arundel by American author Kenneth Roberts. Additionally, current owner Trish Mason has written a work of non-fiction entitled The Seaside House: Maine Innkeepers which tells the complete history of the family and running of the inn.

Awards
The inn was recognised by New England's Yankee Magazine as the Maine lodging with the "Best Family Ties" in 2009.

References

External links

Buildings and structures in Kennebunkport, Maine
Hotels in Maine
Companies established in 1667
1667 establishments in the Thirteen Colonies